Susoctocog alfa, sold under the brand name Obizur, is a medication used for the treatment of bleeding episodes in adults with acquired haemophilia, a bleeding disorder caused by the spontaneous development of antibodies that inactivate factor VIII.

Susoctocog alfa was approved for medical use in the United States in October 2014, and for medical use in the European Union in November 2015.

Factor VIII is one of the proteins needed for normal clotting of the blood.

References

External links 
 

Antihemorrhagics